Thordarhyrna is one of seven subglacial volcanoes beneath the Vatnajokull glacier Iceland.

Eruptions
It last erupted in 1910 and prior to that in 1903.

An eruption in 3550 BC ± 500 years poured out 150,000,000 cubic meters of lava in the area Bergvatnsárhraun to the south of Thordarhyrna.

An eruption between 1887 and 1889 had a VEI of 2.

Geology
There is a mechanical interaction between Thordarhyrna and Grimsvötn, despite these volcanoes being relatively far apart, so the eruption in 1902 - 1904 was combined with an eruption from Grimsvötn and had a Volcanic Explosivity Index (VEI) of 4.

A fault runs (N.35°W) from Thordarhyrna towards Hamarinn, and separates two different tectonic regions.

See also
List of volcanoes in Iceland

References

Subglacial volcanoes of Iceland
VEI-4 volcanoes